Frescheville may refer to:

John Frescheville
Frescheville Holles